A Grain of Truth (Polish original title: Ziarno prawdy) is a 2015 Polish film directed by Borys Lankosz, film adaptation of the novel of the same title by Zygmunt Miłoszewski.

The filming period lasted from April 30 to May 27, 2014. Pictures were shot in Sandomierz, Śmiłów, Wysiadłów (gas station), Chełmno (cathedral), Otwock, Warsaw and Lublin. The national premiere took place on January 30, 2015, and the world premiere on January 19, 2015.

Plot 
The naked body of a young woman is found under the Sandomierz synagogue. Prosecutor Teodor Szacki begins a murder investigation. It turns out that the corpse of the woman was bled, and the expert says that the murder weapon found on the spot is used during ritual slaughter of animals. Linking to the dark history of ritual murders of children triggers anti-Semitic mood. Aiming to find out the truth, Szacki will find that there is a grain of truth in every story that can trigger a spiral of crime in the right place at the right time.

Cast 
 Robert Więckiewicz – Teodor Szacki
 Jerzy Trela – Leon Wilczur
 Magdalena Walach – Barbara Sobieraj
  – Klara
  – Elżbieta Budnik
 Krzysztof Pieczyński – Grzegorz Budnik
 Andrzej Zieliński – Jerzy Szyller
 Zohar Strauss – rabin Zygmunt
 Modest Ruciński – Roman Myszyński
 Iwona Bielska – Maria Miszczyk
 Jacek Poniedziałek – Klejnocki
 Marcin Juchniewicz – Rzeźnicki
 Andrzej Konopka – Marszałek (police officer)
 Zbigniew Konopka – Wojtuś (police officer)

References

External links

2015 films
Polish drama films
2015 drama films